General elections were held in the Bahamas on 16 September 2021 to elect all 38 members of the House of Assembly.

Around two hours after the polls closed, and results started to trickle in, Prime Minister Hubert Minnis conceded defeat, after results showed his party Free National Movement losing several seats they previously held. Since 1997, every election has resulted in a change of government. On 17 September Philip Davis of the Progressive Liberal Party was sworn in as prime minister.

Background
The Bahamas has been affected by the COVID-19 pandemic.

In January 2021, it was reported that the PLP was expecting an early election.

At dissolution, the FNM was down four seats on their 2017 result; House Speaker Halson Moultrie, Reece Chipman, and Frederick McAlpine left the party to sit and run for re-election as independents, whilst Vaughn Miller defected to the PLP.

In the run up to the 2021 election, there were plans to implement biometric I.D. Cards which could be used for voting, however, such a proposal did not manifest by the time of the election.

Electoral system 
Members of the House of Assembly are elected from single-member constituencies using first-past-the-post voting. The majority party then selects the Prime Minister, who is appointed by the Governor-General.

Candidates
On 3 February, the Progressive Liberal Party revealed their first 18 candidates. On 21 June 2021, they selected the rest of their candidates for the election. The Free National Movement completed ratifying candidates by July 2021.

The Democratic National Alliance posted a slate of 19 candidates in March 2021. New parties include Coalition of Independents, formed by members of Bahamian Evolution, and the Grand Commonwealth Party. House Speaker Moultrie formed an electoral alliance of independent and third party candidates.

Results
The elections were observed by several teams including the Caribbean Community, the Commonwealth and the Organisation of American States.

Seat that changed hands

Free National to Progressive Liberal
 Bain Town and Grants Town: won by Wayde Watson
 Bamboo Town: won by Patricia Deveaux
 Carmichael: won by Keith Bell
 Central and South Abaco: won by John Pinder II
 Central and South Eleuthera: won by Clay Sweeting
 Centreville: won by Jomo Campbell
 Elizabeth: won by JoBeth Coleby-Davis
 Fort Charlotte: won by Alfred Sears
 Fox Hill: won by Fred Mitchell
 Freetown: won by Wayne Munroe
 Garden Hills: won by Mario Bowleg
 Golden Gates: won by Pia Glover-Rolle
 Golden Isles: won by Vaughn Miller
 Marathon: won by Lisa Rahming
 MICAL: won by Basil McIntosh
 Mount Moriah: won by Mckell Bonaby
 Nassau Village: won by Jamal Strachan
 North Abaco: won by Kirk Cornish
 North Andros and Berry Islands: won by Leonardo Lightbourne
 North Eleuthera: won by Sylvannus Petty
 Pineridge: won by Ginger Moxey
 Pinewood: won by Myles Laroda
 Sea Breeze: won by Leslia Miller-Brice
 South Beach: won by Bacchus Rolle
 Southern Shores: won Leroy Major
 Tall Pines: won by Michael Darville
 Yamacraw: won by Zane Lightbourne

Aftermath 

Free National Movement: In a concession speech released by the FNM, outgoing prime minister Hubert Minnis thanked Bahamians for the last four years. “Tonight I spoke with Leader of the Progressive Liberal Party Philip Davis and offered my congratulations to him and his party on their victory at the polls. I offered him my best wishes as his Government now faces the continued fight against COVID-19, and the restoration of our economy. I would like to thank the tens of thousands of Bahamians from across The Bahamas who voted for Free National Movement candidates. I also congratulate the FNM candidates who won seats in the House of Assembly. I am in that number, and again my gratitude goes out to the people of Killarney for making me their representative for the fourth consecutive time. I will lead the Free National Movement into the House as the leader of Her Majesty’s Loyal Opposition. The Bahamas has a proud democratic tradition. The people decide who serves as government."

Progressive Liberal Party: Philip Davis expected to become the next prime minister addressed supporters in Cat Island. He told his constituents they've been through so much together. “Thank you for seeing the possibilities of what we can build together for our children and grandchildren, in the morning, we will rise as one nation and meet the challenges ahead.

On 17 September, Philip Davis was sworn in as Prime Minister.

References

Elections in the Bahamas
Bahamas
General
Election and referendum articles with incomplete results